The 25th Writers Guild of America Awards honored the best film writers and television writers of 1972. Winners were announced at the Beverly Hilton Hotel, Los Angeles, California on March 16, 1973.

Winners & Nominees

Film 
Winners are listed first highlighted in boldface.

Television

Special Awards

References

External links 

 WGA.org

1972
W
Writers Guild of America Awards
Writers Guild of America Awards
Writers Guild of America Awards
Writers Guild of America Awards